The 1999 Solihull Metropolitan Borough Council election took place on 6 May 1999 to elect members of Solihull Metropolitan Borough Council in the West Midlands, England. 
One third of the council was up for election and the council stayed under no overall control.

Campaign
Before the election the Conservative party needed to gain 5 seats in order to take control over the council, which was being run by a Labour led administration. The Conservatives were defending 7 seats at the election, compared to 6 for Labour, 4 for the Liberal Democrats and 1 independent seat. The 2 seats that were to be contested in Shirley West ward after the death of a Labour councillor and the stepping down of an independent councillor at the election were top targets for the Conservatives.

Labour defended their record in control of the council pointing to their record in combating crime and surpassing national targets for reducing class sizes. However the Conservatives were optimistic of making gains and said they could deliver good services, while keeping council tax levels low.

Election result
The results saw the Conservatives make 3 gains to strengthen their position as the largest party on the council with 24 seats, but failed to make the 5 gains they needed to take majority control. The Conservatives easily gained the 2 seats contested in Shirley West and another in Elmdon from Labour, but fell short in another 2 seats. They were just 15 votes from winning Shirley East from the Liberal Democrats, while in Packwood the Liberal Democrats held on by 76 votes over the Conservatives after 2 recounts. Overall turnout in the election was 28.3%.

The Conservatives won over half of the votes in the election, but combined the Labour and Liberal Democrat parties retained more seats. However following the election the Liberal Democrats refused to make any agreement with Labour, thus allowing the Conservatives to take control as the largest party from Labour who had run the council since 1996. Labour councillor Arthur Harper was meanwhile elected mayor, becoming the first Labour councillor to hold the post since 1980.

This result had the following consequences for the total number of seats on the council after the elections :

Ward results

|- style="background-color:#F6F6F6"
! style="background-color: " |
| colspan="2"   | Conservative gain from Independent Ratepayers 
| align="right" | Swing
| align="right" |
|-

References

1999 English local elections
1999
1990s in the West Midlands (county)